Kung Fury: Original Motion Picture Soundtrack is the soundtrack album for the 2015 Swedish short film Kung Fury, released by Universal Music Sweden on July 8, 2015. It was composed by Swedish synthwave musicians Mitch Murder and Lost Years, with additional music by Patrik Öberg, Christoffer Ling, Highway Superstar, and Betamaxx. It was released on vinyl record on July 8, 2015.

David Hasselhoff produced and starred in a music video of the song "True Survivor", which debuted on April 16, 2015. It features him interacting with the film's writer/director/star David Sandberg, interspersed with scenes from the film.

Track listing

Kung Fury (Lost Tapes)

A separate soundtrack by Mitch Murder titled Kung Fury (Lost Tapes) was released independently on August 28, 2015. The album contains tracks that were not in the film's final cut or did not make it in the first soundtrack.

Track listing

References

External links
 (OST)
 (Lost Tapes)

2015 soundtrack albums
Film scores
Universal Music Group soundtracks